This is a list of programs previously broadcast by CT, a Filipino cable and satellite television network that includes dramas, sitcoms, reality, men's lifestyle, classic shows, and talk show programs produced in the U.S. and Britain. Most of the American TV shows are from broadcast networks such as ABC, CBS, NBC, Fox, and The CW and cable channels such as FX, TBS, Syfy, and USA Network.

On March 22, 2015, the channel was renamed as CT, signaling a deviation from the "Jack" branding.

Previous programs

CHASE/Jack City/CT
Note: CHASE/JackCITY was also aired via BEAM TV before September 1, 2014.

 24
 24: Live Another Day 
 Alcatraz
 Allegiance
 The Americans 
 American Crime Story
 American Odyssey
 Arrow 
 Autopsy: The Last Hours of... 
 Awake
 Best Bars in America
 The Black Box 
 Black Work
 Blue
 Breakout Kings 
 Bones
 Burn Notice
 Car Matchmaker
 Chase
 Chicago Fire
 Chicago P.D.
 City Eye 
 City Lounge Presents 
 The Closer
 Cold Case 
 Complications
 Containment
 Covert Affairs
 CT Exclusive
 CT Premiere
 Dig
 Do No Harm 
 Elementary
 The Following
 Forever
 Fringe
 Game of Silence
 Gang Related
 Golden Boy
 Gotham 
 Graceland
 Grimm 
 The Grinder
 Ground Floor
 Hiding
 House
 How I Rock It
 In Plain Sight
 Ironside
 JackCITY Central
 JackCITY Exclusives 
 The Killing
 Law & Order
 Law & Order: Special Victims Unit 
 Legends 
 Life
 Limelight 
 Lucky Bastards 
 Martina Cole's The Runaway
 Monday Mornings
 Motive 
 Mr. Selfridge
 NCIS 
 No Second Chance
 The Odd Couple 
 Person of Interest 
 Persons Unknown
 Prime Suspect
 Psych 
 Reckless
 Rectify 
 Revolution
 Rosewood
 Royal Pains
 Rush
 Shades of Blue
 Significant Mother
 Sons of Anarchy
 The Strain 
 Terra Nova
 The Mentalist
 Those Who Kill
 The Tonight Show Starring Jimmy Fallon 
 Touch
 Trauma 
 Tyrant 
 V
 Vegas
 Weekend Fix
 Warehouse 13
 White Collar
 Without a Trace
 Women We Love

See also
Chase
CT
Jack City
Solar Entertainment Corporation

References

CT
Solar Entertainment Corporation